Jannick de Jong (born 7 June 1987) is Dutch motorcycle racer and competes in longtrack and Grasstrack. Jannick has been Long Track World Champion once in 2015 and European Grasstrack Champion three time in 2013, 2014 and 2015.

World Longtrack Championship

Grand-Prix

 2005 - 4 apps (12th) 31pts
 2006 - 2 apps (17th) 10pts
 2007 - 3 apps (11th) 28pts
 2008 - 4 apps (9th) 33pts
 2009 - 4 apps (10th) 42pts
 2010 - 6 apps (9th) 70pts
 2011 - 0 apps 
 2012 - 6 apps (9th) 74pts
 2013 - 6 apps (Second) 97pts
 2014 - 4 apps (Second) 72pts
 2015 - 4 apps (First) 75pts
 2016 - 5 apps (Second) 101pts

Best Grand-Prix Results
  Eenrum Second 2016, Third 2013
  Forssa First 2016, Third 2013
  Herxheim First 2014, 2017
  Marmande First 2014, Second 2010, 2013
  Morizes First 2015
  Mühldorf Third 2016
  Vechta Second 2016

Team Championship
 2007  Morizes (5th) 32pts (Rode with Dirk Fabriek, Theo Pijper, Erik Eijbergen)
 2008  Wertle (Second) 45pts (Rode with Dirk Fabriek, Erik Eijbergen, Mark Stiekema)
 2009  Eenrum (Second) 46pts (Rode with Dirk Fabriek, Theo Pijper, Mark Stiekema)
 2010 Did not compete
 2011  Scheeßel (Second) 38pts (Rode with Sjoerd Rozenberg, Mark Stiekema, Jeffrey Woortman)
 2012 Did not compete
 2013  Folkestone (First) 65pts (Rode with Dirk Fabriek, Theo Pijper, Mark Stiekema))
 2014  Forssa (Second) 41pts (Rode with Dirk Fabriek, Theo Pijper, Henry van der Steen)
 2015  Mühldorf (Fifth) 31pts (Rode with Henry van der Steen & Sjoerd Rozenberg)
 2016  Marianske Lazne (First) 46pts (Rode with Theo Pijper, Dirk Fabriek, Romano Hummel)

Grasstrack European Championship

Finalist
 2004  Eenrum (10th) 11pts
 2005  Schwarme (17th) 4pts
 2006  La Reole (9th) 10pts
 2007  Folkestone (7th) 11pts
 2008  Siddeburen (11th) 8pts
 2009  Berghaupten (7th) 14pts
 2010  La Reole (5th) 12pts
 2011  Skegness (Second) 10pts
 2012  Eenrum (Third) 16pts
 2013  Bielefeld (Champion) 19pts
 2014  St. Macaire (Champion) 20pts 2015  Staphorst (Champion) 19pts 2016  Folkestone (6th) 17pts

Semi-finalist
 2003  Schwarme (14th) 5pts

Dutch Grasstrack Championship
 2003 (Third) 2004 (Champion) 2005 (8th)
 2006 (Champion) 2007 (Champion) 2008 (Third) 2009 (6th) 2010 (Third) 2011 (Champion) 2012 (Second) 2013 (Champion) 2014 (Champion) 2015 (Champion) 2016 (Champion)'''

References

External links
 Jannick de Jong - Grasstrack GB
 Nouvelles
 
 Netherlands national long track team
 Jannick rides to the front
 Long Track Racing: de Jong wins first Grand Prix round in Herxheim | | Worldspeedway

Dutch speedway riders
Dutch motorcycle racers
1987 births
Living people
Individual Speedway Long Track World Championship riders
21st-century Dutch people